Pete Sampras was the defending champion, but did not participate.

Jim Courier won the title, defeating Andre Agassi 6–3, 6–4 in the final.

Seeds
The top eight seeds received a bye into the second round.

Draw

Finals

Top half

Section 1

Section 2

Bottom half

Section 3

Section 4

References

External links
Draw

1995 Japan Open Tennis Championships